Norhasikin Amin is a former Malaysian badminton player. She was part of the national team that won the women's team silver medal at the 1998 Commonwealth Games. Amin had collected five medals at the Southeast Asian Games, a silver in the mixed doubles event in 1999, a bronze in the women's doubles in 2001, also another three bronzes in the women's team in 1997, 1999 and 2001.

Achievements

Southeast Asian Games 
Women's doubles

Mixed doubles

IBF World Grand Prix 
The World Badminton Grand Prix sanctioned by International Badminton Federation (IBF) since 1983.

Women's doubles

IBF International 
Women's doubles

Mixed doubles

References

External links 
 

Living people
Place of birth missing (living people)
Malaysian female badminton players
Badminton players at the 1998 Commonwealth Games
Commonwealth Games silver medallists for Malaysia
Commonwealth Games medallists in badminton
Competitors at the 1997 Southeast Asian Games
Competitors at the 1999 Southeast Asian Games
Competitors at the 2001 Southeast Asian Games
Southeast Asian Games silver medalists for Malaysia
Southeast Asian Games bronze medalists for Malaysia
Southeast Asian Games medalists in badminton
1975 births
Medallists at the 1998 Commonwealth Games